A Negroni is an Italian cocktail, made of one part gin, one part vermouth rosso (red, semi-sweet) and one part Campari, garnished with orange peel. It is considered an apéritif.

A traditionally made Negroni is stirred, not shaken; it is built over ice in an old-fashioned or rocks glass and garnished with a slice of orange. Outside of Italy, an orange peel is often used in place of an orange slice.

History

The drink's origins are not known with certainty.  The most widely reported account is that it was first mixed in Florence, Italy, in 1919, at Caffè Giacosa (then called Caffè Casoni), on Via de' Tornabuoni. (The Caffè no longer exists; the site is now occupied by a Giorgio Armani boutique.) Pascal Olivier Count de Negroni concocted it by asking the bartender, Fosco Scarselli, to strengthen his favorite cocktail, the Americano, by adding gin rather than the normal soda water. The bartender also added an orange garnish rather than the typical lemon garnish of the Americano to signify that it was a different drink.

After the success of the cocktail, the Negroni family founded Negroni Distillerie in Treviso, Italy, and produced a ready-made version of the drink, sold as Antico Negroni 1919. One of the earliest reports of the drink came from Orson Welles in correspondence with the Coshocton Tribune while working in Rome on Cagliostro in 1947, where he described a new drink called the Negroni, "The bitters are excellent for your liver, the gin is bad for you. They balance each other."

Cocktail historian David Wondrich researched Camillo Negroni, whose status as a count is questionable, but whose grandfather, Luigi Negroni, was indeed a count.

Descendants of General Pascal Olivier de Negroni, Count de Negroni, say he was the Count Negroni who invented the drink in 1857 in Senegal. A Corse-Matin Sunday Edition article from 1980 says he invented the drink around 1914. An article in the New Hampshire Union Leader reported on the controversy.

In 2013, Imbibe and Campari launched Negroni Week, celebrating and marketing the cocktail while raising money for philanthropy. Negroni Week has raised over $3 million for charity worldwide. Negroni Week is held in the first week of September each year.

Variations

 Americano: 1 oz Campari, 1 oz sweet red vermouth, a splash of soda
 Boulevardier: uses whiskey in place of gin
 Stanley Tucci: 2 parts Plymouth Gin, 1 part Campari Bitter and 1 part Carpano Antica Formula 1786 Red Vermouth, and a slice of orange 
 Cardinale: uses dry vermouth in place of sweet vermouth
 Dutch Negroni: uses Jenever for the London dry gin
 Negroni sbagliato ("mistaken Negroni"): uses sparkling white wine or Prosecco (spumante) in place of gin
 Negroscan: a New Hampshire drink that uses traditional Scandinavian akvavit instead of gin
 Old 'Groni: uses Old Tom-style gin in place of the usual London dry gin
 Old Pal: uses dry vermouth and Canadian rye whisky
 Queen's Negroni: A British variant that replaces the Campari with Pimm's
 Agavoni or Tegroni: uses tequila in place of gin.
 White Negroni: gin, Lillet blanc, and Suze
 A Negroni served with a dash of freshly squeezed orange juice was named a Negroni malato ("sick Negroni") at Bar Piccolino in Exchange Square, London during the 2007 financial crisis, by Italian bankers employed at nearby RBS offices.
 Chilean Negroni: uses pisco in place of gin.
 National Negroni: uses Chilean herbal liqueur araucano in place of gin.

See also
 List of cocktails

References

External links

 Negronis Across the World blog
 Origine e curiosità del cocktail IBA Negroni 
 Negroni Week

Cocktails with gin
Cocktails with vermouth
Cocktails with Campari
Cocktails with bitters
Spirit-forward cocktails
Three-ingredient cocktails